Babingtonia pelloeae, commonly known as Pelloe's babingtonia, is a shrub endemic to Western Australia.

Distribution
It is found in a small area in Wheatbelt and the outskirts of Perth in Western Australia between Gosnells and Gingin.

References

Eudicots of Western Australia
pelloeae
Endemic flora of Western Australia
Plants described in 2015
Taxa named by Barbara Lynette Rye
Taxa named by Malcolm Eric Trudgen